James Brown Fisk (August 30, 1910 – August 10, 1981) was president of Bell Labs from 1959 to 1973.

Biography
He was born on August 30, 1910, in West Warwick, Rhode Island.

He received his degrees from Massachusetts Institute of Technology, his Ph.D. dissertation was entitled “The Scattering of Electrons from Molecules.” He joined Bell Laboratories in 1939. He was named vice-president of research in 1954. He headed Bell Labs from 1959 to 1973. He was named chairman of the board of Bell Laboratories in 1973 and retired in 1974.

Upon his death, he lived in Basking Ridge, N.J. with his wife, Cynthia.

Awards and Honors 
Elected to the American Academy of Arts and Sciences (1949)
Elected to the United States National Academy of Sciences (1954)
Elected to the American Philosophical Society (1960)
Medal of the Industrial Research Institute (1963)
Washington Award of the Western Society of Engineers (1968)
Advancement of Research Award of the American Society of Metals (1974)
Hoover Medal (1975)
Founders Medal from National Academy of Engineering. (1975)

References

External links 
American National Biography, James Brown Fisk
Memorial Tributes: National Academy of Engineering, Volume 4
National Academy of Sciences- A Biographical Memoir by William Doherty 1987

1910 births
1981 deaths
People from West Warwick, Rhode Island
People from Elizabethtown, New York
Massachusetts Institute of Technology alumni
Scientists at Bell Labs
Members of the American Philosophical Society